Electron resonance imaging (ERI) is a preclinical imaging method, together with positron emission tomography (PET), computed tomography scan (CT scan), magnetic resonance imaging (MRI), and other techniques. ERI is dedicated to imaging small laboratory animals and its unique feature is the ability to detect free radicals. This technique could also be used for other purposes such as material science, quality of food, etc.

For in vivo imaging purposes, ERI is a minimally invasive method. It requires an intravenous injection of the external substances, called spin probes (usually nitroxide or triarylmethyl compounds). The main advantage of ERI modality is the ability of mapping the tissue microenvironment parameters e.g. oxygen partial pressure (pO2), redox status, oxidative stress, thiol concentration, pH, inorganic phosphorus, viscosity, etc. ERI is commonly used to research in the areas of oncology, neurodegenerative disorders and drug development.

Origin 
ERI is a preclinical application of electron paramagnetic resonance imaging (EPRI). The term "ERI" was introduced in order to distinguish a commercial device from EPRI devices that are normally used in the academic domain.

Electron paramagnetic resonance (EPR) spectroscopy is dedicated to the research of substances with unpaired electrons. It was first introduced in 1944, approximately the same time as the similar phenomenon - nuclear magnetic resonance (NMR). Owing to hardware and software limitations, EPR was not developing as rapidly as NMR. This led to a huge gap between these two methods. Therefore, to underline a breakthrough in preclinical imaging, by presenting EPRI as a complementary method to the present ones, the term "ERI" was introduced.

In vivo applications

Oxygen imaging 
One of the many possible applications of ERI is the ability to measure the absolute value of oxygen. The width of the EPR signal from oxygen-sensitive spin probes depends linearly from the oxygen concentration in tissues. Therefore, the information about the oxygen value is collected directly from the examined areas. Oxygen mapping is commonly used for planning and improving the effectiveness of radiotherapy treatments. Trityl spin probes are the most suitable for the use in oxygen imaging.

Redox status and oxidative stress 
The unique property of ERI is the ability to track reactive oxygen species (ROS). Those particles are versatile and are constantly generated in living organisms. ROS plays a special role in oxidative and reduction mechanisms. In a normal physiological state, the number of ROS is controlled by antioxidants. Factors that increase the number of ROS (e.g. ionizing radiation, metal ions, etc.) will cause their overproduction. This state leads to an imbalance between those particles and is therefore called the oxidative stress.

Pharmacokinetics 
ERI allows for dynamic measurements and 3D tracking of the spin probe. In this case, the term "dynamics" refers to the fast repetition of the imaging process, and the tracking of changes in the signal intensity for each location that is imaged over time. Owing to the high temporal resolution and sensitivity of the method, it is possible to distinguish both the inflow and outflow phases of the spin probe, the bio-distribution, and the time to reach a maximum concentration of the spin probe.

Spin probes 
In natural conditions, free radicals are characterised with an extremely short lifespan, so in order to capture the EPR signal, an external molecule with a stable free radical must be delivered. Usually it happens by injection into the animal's body. There are two main classes of spin probes used for imaging: nitroxide and triarylmethyl (TAM, trityl) radicals.

Nitroxide radicals are sensitive to oxygen concentration, pH, thiol concentrations, viscosity and polarity. The issue with these type of spin probes is their fast reduction, which sometimes leads to loss of the EPR signal. Triarylmethyl radicals are characterised by a far longer lifespan, and an increased stability towards reducing and oxidising biological agents. They are perfect for measuring the oxygen concentration, pH, thiol concentrations, inorganic phosphate and redox status.

Although, the aforementioned spin probes are the most popular choice, there are many more that can be used in ERI. One of many examples is melanin – a polymeric pigment that contains a mixture of eumelanin and pheomelanin. This is the only substance that occurs in natural conditions and allows for the registration of the EPR signal, without the need to deliver extraneous spin probes.

References

External links 
 ERI Imaging - Method (Novilet)

Radiology